Peter Robin Whittle (born 6 January 1961) is a British politician, author, journalist and broadcaster who served as a Member of the London Assembly from 2016 to 2021 and as Deputy Leader of the UK Independence Party (UKIP) to Paul Nuttall from 2016 to 2017. He is the founder and director of the New Culture Forum think tank and host of So What You're Saying Is..., a weekly cultural and political interview show on YouTube.

After a career in media in the United Kingdom and United States, Whittle founded the New Culture Forum in 2006. He joined the UK Independence Party (UKIP) and was the party's candidate for the 2016 London mayoral contest, which was held at the same time as his election to the London Assembly. He served as the party's deputy leader between November 2016 and October 2017 and was a prominent, but unsuccessful, candidate in the 2017 UKIP leadership election.

Whittle resigned as UKIP's London Assembly leader in January 2018, following Henry Bolton's refusal to stand down following a vote of no confidence in his leadership by UKIP's National Executive Committee. He resigned his membership of UKIP in protest at Gerard Batten's leadership in December 2018, after which he served as leader of the new Brexit Alliance in the London Assembly and as chairman of the Assembly's audit panel.

Early life
Whittle was born in the General Lying-in Hospital in Waterloo, London. Shortly after his birth Whittle's family moved across South East London, from Peckham to Shooter's Hill. Whittle attended The John Roan School, Orpington College and the University of Kent, where he obtained a BA in history and politics.

Career

Television and newspapers
Between 1991 and 2003 Whittle worked as a TV producer and director of arts and factual programmes for ITV, Channel 4 and Channel 5 in the United Kingdom, including a prolonged stint at the long-running TV arts series The South Bank Show, as well as USA Network and Fox Broadcasting Company in the United States, living for five years in Los Angeles.

As a journalist he was an arts and film critic for national and international publications including The Times, The Sunday Times and the Los Angeles Times, as well as a columnist for Standpoint magazine (for which he wrote "Whittle's London"). Starting with regular contributions as a cultural commentator and critic on BBC Two's Newsnight Review (later The Review Show) in the 2000s, Whittle has made appearances in the broadcast media, on programmes such as Question Time and The Andrew Marr Show on BBC One, and Start the Week, Any Questions? and The Moral Maze on BBC Radio 4.

New Culture Forum
In 2006 Whittle founded the New Culture Forum (NCF), a think tank whose mission is described as "challenging the cultural orthodoxies dominant in the media, academia, education, and British culture in its widest sense." Speakers at NCF events, including for its annual keynote Smith Lecture, have included Martin Amis, Dame Vivien Westwood, Jeremy Hunt, Michael Gove, Nigel Farage, Justin Webb, Sir Anthony Seldon, Petroc Trelawny, Ed Vaizey, Melanie Phillips, Brendan O'Neill and Owen Jones. Writers for the New Culture Forum have included Douglas Murray, Julie Bindel, Ed West and Dennis Sewell.

In 2019 Whittle launched the New Culture Forum channel, a YouTube channel which aims to redress the balance which it claims is currently lacking in the mainstream media. Now one of the UK's most popular conservative/rightwing channels, the NCF channel currently provides three distinct programmes: "So What You're Saying Is...", "NCF CounterCulture" and "NCF Newspeak".

Hosted by Whittle himself, So What You're Saying Is...is the New Culture Forum's flagship interview programme and is named after a phrase repeatedly uttered by Cathy Newman of Britain's Channel 4 News during a combative interview with the Canadian psychologist and professor of psychology Jordan Peterson. The interview, regarded by many commentators as symbolic of a wider problem amongst the mainstream media, became a viral phenomenon, with critics alleging Newman's preconceptions led her to misinterpret Peterson and alter his statements.

Covering newsworthy cultural, social and political topics, So What You're Saying Is... features 30-60 minute discussions with experts, notable figures and others from fields such as journalism, academia, politics and activism. Guests and topics have included Peter Hitchens and Sir Roger Scruton on conservatism, Laurence Fox on the Reclaim Party, Ann Widdecombe on free speech, Dave Rubin on the culture wars and Robin Aitken on bias at the BBC.

Following the success of "So What You're Saying Is...", Whittle launched "NCF CounterCulture", a cultural and socio-political discussion show. Hosted by Whittle, the weekly programme features a panel composed of a resident panelist (the author & historian Rafe Heydel-Mankoo) and 2-3 guest panelists. Guest panelists have included Lionel Shriver, Claire Fox, James Delingpole, Charles Moore and Andrew Klavan.

The NCF channel's third weekly programme, NCF Newspeak, provides a platform for individuals to personally address the public on a relevant subject of their choosing by means of a short, self-authored speech direct to camera.

Politics
At the 2006 local elections in Greenwich, Whittle unsuccessfully contested the Blackheath Westcombe ward for the Conservative Party.

Whittle became UKIP's cultural spokesman in 2013, and stood for Eltham at the 2015 general election, coming third with 15% of the vote, with a share surpassing both the Liberal Democrats and the Green Party.

In September 2015, Whittle was selected as the UKIP candidate for Mayor of London, as well as topping the party list for election to the London Assembly. He was subsequently elected as a London Assembly Member in the Assembly elections of May 2016.

On 12 October 2016, Whittle announced his intention to stand for UKIP leader in November's election called following the resignation of Diane James after just 18 days; however, on reflection, he decided to stand for the position of deputy leader instead and was duly successful in this candidature. On 28 November 2016, it was announced that Whittle was the new deputy leader of UKIP, replacing Paul Nuttall, then newly appointed as party leader. Following the election of Henry Bolton as leader of UKIP in October 2017, Whittle left the role of deputy leader and was appointed UKIP spokesman for London affairs (the party's leader in the London Assembly). He resigned as London spokesman on 22 January 2018, following Bolton's refusal to stand down after a vote of no confidence in his leadership by UKIP's National Executive Committee.

In December 2018, Whittle resigned from UKIP in protest at Gerard Batten's leadership. He then served as an independent member of the London Assembly and leader of the Assembly's Brexit Alliance group, as well as chairman of the London Assembly's audit panel and a member of its police and crime committee, the Greater London Authority (GLA) oversight committee and confirmation hearings committee. The Brexit Alliance was a GLA grouping of independents and not a registered political party, and it consisted of Whittle and David Kurten, who continued to be a member of UKIP until January 2020.

He did not seek re-election at the 2021 London Assembly election.

Personal life
Whittle previously lived in south east London. He is openly gay and was the only LGBT candidate selected by any of the parties for the 2016 London mayoral election.

, he lives in Windsor, Berkshire.

Books
Look at Me: Celebrating the Self in Modern Britain, London: 2008 (1st edn), 2018 (2nd edn).
Private Views: Voices from the Frontline of British Culture, London: 2009.
A Sorry State: Self-Denigration in British Culture, London: 2010. 
Monarchy Matters, London: 2011. 
Being British: What's Wrong With It?, London: 2012.
Reel Life: Peter Whittle at the Movies, London: 2014.

References

External links 

 Peter Whittle on Twitter (@prwhittle)
 New Culture Forum (official website)
 So What You're Saying Is... (YouTube channel)

1961 births
Living people
Alumni of the University of Kent
UK Independence Party Members of the London Assembly
UK Independence Party parliamentary candidates
English LGBT politicians
Gay politicians
People from Peckham
British political writers
British critics of Islam
British social commentators
Critics of multiculturalism
English film critics
English columnists
English male journalists
21st-century British politicians
Conservatism in the United Kingdom
British Eurosceptics